Nicklas Cajback (born 9 June 1986) is a Swedish motorcycle racer.

Career statistics

Grand Prix motorcycle racing

By season

Races by year
(key)

Supersport World Championship

Races by year
(key)

== References ==

External links
Profile on MotoGP.com
Profile on WorldSBK.com

1986 births
Living people
Swedish motorcycle racers
250cc World Championship riders
Supersport World Championship riders
Sportspeople from Stockholm